Fry's English Delight is a BBC Radio 4 documentary series in which language enthusiast Stephen Fry explores various aspects of the English language.

The title is an allusion to the British confectionery Fry's Turkish Delight.

Episode guide

Audiobooks
Up to series 7, every episode of Fry's English Delight has been released on CD and is also currently available in the form of audio downloads. The first series also contains the 2007 documentary Current Puns presented by Fry on Radio 4 on 26 December 2007. The second series contains the 2006 documentary The Joy of Gibberish, presented by Fry on Radio 4 on 3 January 2006.

References

External links

BBC Radio 4 programmes
Stephen Fry